is a Japanese figure skating coach and former competitor. She retired from skating shortly after placing 26th in the 1968 Winter Olympic Games. Her sister is Ayumi Ishida, who is a singer and actress.

Results

References 
Okamoto haruko Interview

1945 births
Living people
Japanese female single skaters
Olympic figure skaters of Japan
Figure skaters at the 1968 Winter Olympics